Hugh Percy, 1st Duke of Northumberland,  (c. 17146 June 1786), was an English peer, landowner, and art patron.

Origins
He was born Hugh Smithson, the son of Lansdale Smithson (b. 1682) of Langdale and Philadelphia Revely. He was a grandson of Sir Hugh Smithson, 3rd Baronet, from whom he inherited the Smithson Baronetcy in 1733.

Marriage, projects and patronages
He changed his surname to Percy in 1749, nine years after his  marriage with Lady Elizabeth Seymour (1716–1776), daughter of  The 7th Duke of Somerset, on 16 July 1740, through a private Act of Parliament. 

She was Baroness Percy in her own right, and indirect heiress of the Percy family, which was one of the leading landowning families of England and had previously held the Earldom of Northumberland for several centuries. The title Earl of Northumberland passed by special remainder to Hugh Percy, as Elizabeth's husband, when her father died on 7 February 1750; he had been created 1st Earl of Northumberland in 1749. In 1766, the earl was created 1st Duke of Northumberland and was created Baron Lovaine on 28 June 1784, with a special remainder in favour of his younger son, Algernon (in reference to the Louvain family of the Landgraviate of Brabant, which married the Percy heiress, was the origin of the Percy family of England). Richard de Percy, 5th Baron Percy (c. 1170–1244) (who adopted the surname Percy), was the son of Joscelin of Louvain (1121–1180), styled "brother of the queen" (referring to Adeliza of Louvain, second wife of King Henry I of England, by his wife Agnes de Perci, suo jure Baroness Percy, the heiress of the Percy estates in England.) He was created a Knight of the Order of the Garter in 1756 and a Privy Counsellor in 1762.

He took a somewhat prominent part in politics as a follower of Lord Bute, and was one of George III's confidential advisers. He held the office of Lord Lieutenant of Ireland from 1763 to 1765, and that of Master of the Horse from 1778 to 1780.

Sir Hugh and Lord Brooke (later created Earl of Warwick) were the most important patrons of Canaletto in England.  Smithson made a Grand Tour and was in Venice in 1733, where he acquired two large Canalettos for his seat at Stanwick. In 1736 he became one of the two vice presidents of the Society for the Encouragement of Learning. He rebuilt Stanwick Park c. 1739–1740, mostly to his own designs. He was one of the 175 commissioners for the building of Westminster Bridge, a structure he had Canaletto paint two more large canvases, c. 1747. He built an observatory, designed by Robert Adam, on Ratcheugh Crag, at Longhoughton. Thomas Chippendale dedicated his Gentleman & Cabinet maker's director (1754) to him.

The duke and duchess were prominent patrons of Robert Adam for neoclassical interiors in the Jacobean mansion Northumberland House, the London seat of the Earls of Northumberland; it was demolished  1870–1871 to enable the creation of Trafalgar Square. Remnants of the Northumberland House Glass Drawing-Room are preserved at the Victoria and Albert Museum. The greater Adam interiors for the Duke are at Syon House, executed in the 1760s. At Alnwick Castle, Northumberland, the Duke employed James Wyatt, whose work has been effaced by later remodellings. One or other Adam designed Brizlee Tower for the duke.

Landholdings / seats
Alnwick Castle, Northumberland
Syon House, Middlesex
Northumberland House, Strand, London
Stanwick Hall, Stanwick St John, Yorkshire, the seat of the Smithson baronets.
Kielder Castle, in the Kielder Forest, Northumberland, a shooting box built in 1775 by the 1st Duke to his own design by William Newton.

Death and burial
Hugh died in 1786 and was buried in the Northumberland Vault, within Westminster Abbey.

Family
The duke and duchess had three children:

 Hugh Percy, 2nd Duke of Northumberland (1742–1817)
 Algernon Percy, 1st Earl of Beverley (1750–1830)
 Lady Elizabeth Anne Frances Percy (died 1761); buried within the Northumberland Vault in Westminster Abbey.

The duke's illegitimate son (by Elizabeth Hungerford Keate Macie), James Smithson (1765–1829), is famed for having made the founding bequest and provided the name for the Smithsonian Institution in Washington, D.C.

Further reading
Cruickshanks, Eveline, biography of Smithson, Sir Hugh, 4th Bt. (1715–86), of Stanwick, Yorks. and Tottenham, Mdx., published in The History of Parliament: the House of Commons 1715–1754, ed. R. Sedgwick, 1970 SMITHSON, Sir Hugh, 4th Bt. (1715–86), of Stanwick, Yorks. and Tottenham, Mdx. | History of Parliament Online

References

External links

|-

|-

|-

1710s births
1786 deaths
British MPs 1734–1741
British MPs 1741–1747
British MPs 1747–1754
301
Knights of the Garter
Lord-Lieutenants of Middlesex
Lord-Lieutenants of Northumberland
Members of the Parliament of Great Britain for English constituencies
Hugh Percy, 01 Duke of Northumberland
Fellows of the Royal Society
High Sheriffs of Yorkshire
Burials at Westminster Abbey
Lords Lieutenant of Ireland